The Pacific Club is a historic social club in Honolulu, Hawaii.

History
William Lowthian Green founded the club in 1851 and was its first president. It was originally called "The Mess", and then called "The British Club" since many of its members were former British residents. In 1892 it was renamed the Pacific Club.  After moving around Honolulu, in 1926 it finally acquired the former estate of Archibald Scott Cleghorn, the birthplace of Princess Kaiulani.  In 1959 Vladimir Ossipoff designed a new building with an open lanai which won the Hawaii American Institute of Architects award in 1965. In 1991, the club surpassed 1,000 members.

Notable members
The Pacific Club's membership included Rabbi Tzvi Pesach Frank, and biologist David Lack.
King Kamehameha V became a member in 1870.

Location
The Pacific Club is located on 1451 Queen Emma Street in downtown Honolulu, coordinates .

References

External links
Official website

Organizations established in 1851
History of Oahu
1851 establishments in Hawaii
Gentlemen's clubs in the United States